James William Owen Freeth (born 9 April 1974) is an English former first-class cricketer.

Freeth was born at Bournemouth in April 1974. He was educated at Sherborne School, before going up to Pembroke College, Cambridge. While studying at Cambridge, he played first-class cricket for Cambridge University Cricket Club from 1995 to 1997, making fourteen appearances. Playing as an off break bowler, he took 19 wickets at an average of 70 runs per wicket; his best bowling figures were 4 for 101 vs Derbyshire, including the late DM Jones of Australia.

References

External links

1974 births
Living people
Sportspeople from Bournemouth
Cricketers from Dorset
People educated at Sherborne School
Alumni of Pembroke College, Cambridge
English cricketers
Cambridge University cricketers